Daniel Starch (1883–1979) was an American psychologist and marketing researcher. He is considered to be one of the pioneers of marketing and consumer research in the early 20th century.

Life
Starch received a BS in mathematics and psychology from the Morningside College in Iowa. After that he moved for postgraduation studies to the University of Iowa, where he completed his PhD in psychology in 1906. The advisor of his thesis was Charles E. Seashore. After that he worked briefly as a lecturer in Iowa and then went on to teach at Wellesley College in Massachusetts while pursuing further studies at Harvard University. In 1908 he became a professor at the University of Wisconsin where he stayed until 1919. From 1920 to 1926 he was a professor at Harvard University and in 1923 he founded the marketing research company Daniel Starch and Staff. Later he resigned from his position at Harvard to concentrate on his company and work in the private sector. In 1932 he worked as a consultant and director of a research department of the American Association of Advertising Agencies as well. Starch ran his own company for 50 years until his retirement in 1973 at the age of 90.

Work
Starch authored several books in the fields of psychology, advertising and marketing research. Best known are Experiments in Educational Psychology (1911) and his pioneering work about advertising Advertising: Its Principles, Practice, and Technique and its follow-up Principles of Advertising (1923). He researched and devised methods to assess the effectiveness of advertising, among them what was later to become known as the "Starch test" or "Starch recognition procedure".  Also named after him is the "Starch formula", which describes how to determine the number of people recalling a full-page advertisement from the number of people recalling a half-page advertisement.

Works
 Experiments in Educational Psychology (1911)
 Advertising: Its Principles, Practice, and Technique (1914)
 Principles of Advertising (1923)
 with Hazel Martha Stanton, Wilhelmine Koerth, Roger Barton: Controlling Human Behavior: A First Book in Psychology for College Students (1936)
 with Hazel Martha Stanton, Wilhelmine Koerth: Psychology in Education (1941)
 Measuring Advertising Readership and Results (McGraw-Hill, 1966)
 Look Ahead to Life: How to be a Fine Person (Vantage Press, 1973)
 Educational Measurements
 How to Develop your Executive Ability (1943)

Notes

External links 
 Daniel Starch at adage.com
 Daniel Starch at the J-MC School Hall of Fame der University of Iowa
 . Archives of the History of American Psychology of University of Akron (archived version)

Consumer behaviour
Advertising theorists
Marketing people
Marketing theorists
Market researchers
20th-century American psychologists
1883 births
1979 deaths